Stigmella liota is a moth of the family Nepticulidae. It was described by Vari in 1963. It is found in South Africa (it was described from the Soutpansberg District in Transvaal).

References

Endemic moths of South Africa
Nepticulidae
Moths of Africa
Moths described in 1963